The 1988 King George VI and Queen Elizabeth Stakes was a horse race held at Ascot Racecourse on Saturday 23 July 1988. It was the 38th running of the King George VI and Queen Elizabeth Stakes.

The winner was Ahmed Al Maktoum's Mtoto, a five-year-old bay horse trained at Newmarket, Suffolk by Alec Stewart and ridden by the South African jockey Michael Roberts. Mtoto's victory was the first in the race for his owner, trainer and jockey. Mtoto was the first five-year-old to win the race since Park Top in 1969.

The contenders
The race attracted a field of ten runners, seven trained in the United Kingdom, two from France and one from Italy. The favourite was Unfuwain, a three-year-old colt who had won who had won the Chester Vase by eight lengths and the Princess of Wales's Stakes against older horses by fifteen lengths. The French challengers, Silver Lane and Soft Machine, were not regarded as serious contenders but the Italian runner was the formidable Tony Bin, the winner of the Premio Presidente della Repubblica (twice), the Gran Premio di Milano (twice) and the Gran Premio del Jockey Club. The other major contenders were Mtoto, twice winner of both the Prince of Wales's Stakes and the Eclipse Stakes, Doyoun, winner of the 2000 Guineas and Glacial Storm, runner-up in the Epsom Derby. The Sussex stable of John Dunlop had two representatives, the 1986 St Leger Stakes winner Moon Madness and Almaarad who had won the Hardwicke Stakes at Royal Ascot. The other runner was the filly Percy's Lass, later to become the dam of the Epsom Derby winner Sir Percy. Unfuwain headed the betting at odds of 2/1 ahead of Mtoto (4/1), Tony Bin (9/2) and Glacial Storm (6/1).

The race
Glacial Storm took the early lead and set the pace from Moon Madness and Unfuwain with Doyoun, Soft Machine and Silver Lane close behind whilst Mtoto was restrained in last place. Moon Madness took the lead with five furlong left to run but was overtaken on the turn into the straight by Unfuwain. With a quarter of a mile left to run Unfuwain still held the advantage, but Doyoun was still in contention whilst Tony Bin, Percy's Lass, Almaarad and (on the far outside) Mtoto were all emerging a challengers. Mtoto overtook Unfuwain a furlong from the finish and ran on in the closing stages to beat the favourite by two lengths. Tony Bin was a length and half back in third ahead of Almaarad, Percy's Lass and Doyoun. Soft Machine, Glacial Storm and Silver Lane came next with Moon Madness finishing last.

Race details
 Sponsor: De Beers
 Purse: £356,280; First prize: £218,808
 Surface: Turf
 Going: Good to Soft
 Distance: 12 furlongs
 Number of runners: 10
 Winner's time: 2:37.33

Full result

 Abbreviations: nse = nose; nk = neck; shd = head; hd = head; dist = distance; UR = unseated rider

Winner's details
Further details of the winner, Mtoto
 Sex: Stallion
 Foaled: 1 April 1983
 Country: United Kingdom
 Sire: Busted; Dam: Amazer (Mincio)
 Owner: Ahmed Al Maktoum
 Breeder: John L. Moore

References

King George
 1988
King George VI and Queen Elizabeth Stakes
King George VI and Queen Elizabeth Stakes
20th century in Berkshire